In India, the sport of athletics was introduced during the period of the British Raj. The sport is governed at national level by the Athletics Federation of India, which was formed in 1946. Despite its large population, few Indian athletes have won a medal in a global or major championship. This began to change in the 21st century, when Indians started taking greater interest in athletics more generally and improved facilities for the sport began to be built at a local level. At a continental level, it has been among the more successful Asian nations, though some distance behind China and Japan.

At the national level, there are three major athletics competitions: the annual Indian National Open Athletics Championships and Indian Inter State Senior Athletics Championships (both first held in 1961), and the quadrennial National Games of India (first held in 1924). An Indian National Championships event predated the Open and Inter State ones, being held from 1924 until 1961. An Indian Marathon Championships was first contested in 1938, while the Indian Cross Country Championships celebrated its 50th edition in 2015. An Indian Racewalking Championships was established in 2014. In addition to the main senior championships there are championships for under-20 and under-18 athletes at national and sub-national levels, as well as senior, non-championship competitions in the form of the Athletics Federation Cup and Indian Athletics Grand Prix tour.

History

20th century

At the Olympic Games, the first Indian competitor was Norman Pritchard, an Anglo-Indian, who won silver medals in the 200 metres and 200 metres hurdles at the 1900 Summer Olympics. These remain the only athletics medals for 120 years until Neeraj Chopra won gold medal in Jevelin throw at 2020 Tokyo Olympics. Neeraj created the history by throwing his Jevelin to 87.58 meters in the final at Tokyo. He became first track and field athlete of India, who won gold medal at Olympics.

The first indigenous Indians to compete at the games were sprinter Purma Bannerjee, and distance runners Phadeppa Chaugule and Sadashir Datar at the 1920 Antwerp Olympics. The nation continued to send athletes to the Olympic athletics competition every four years, with Nilima Ghose and Mary D'Souza Sequeira becoming independent India's first female Olympians at the 1952 Helsinki Games.

At a regional level, India took part in the 1930 Far Eastern Championship Games, but failed to win any medals. The nation hosted the Western Asiatic Games and won all but three of the athletics events. India was the host of the debut Asian Games in 1951 and finished second to Japan in the athletics medal table, which included a men's sprint double by Lavy Pinto and two silvers in women's sprints by Roshan Mistry. The country was less successful at the 1954 Asian Games, though Parduman Singh Brar managed a shot put/javelin double and Christine Brown, Stephie D'Souza, Violet Peters, Mary D'Souza Sequeira gave India its first women athletics gold medal, taking the 4 × 100 metres relay title.

Milkha Singh was India's first athlete to gain success at a global level, earning the nickname "The Flying Sikh". He won a 200 metres/400 metres double at the 1958 Asian Games before going on to take the 440 yards title at the British Empire and Commonwealth Games – India's first winner at that competition. He finished fourth in the 400 m at the 1960 Summer Olympics. Decathlete Gurbachan Singh Randhawa won gold at the 1962 Asian Games and placed fifth in the 110 metres hurdles final at the 1964 Olympic Games. Throws athlete Praveen Kumar was the sole Indian athletics medallist at the 1966 British Empire and Commonwealth Games and won back-to-back Asian Games discus titles from 1966 to 1970 (achievements that he converted into a film career).

In the 1970s, Indian athletes had increased regional success. Kamaljeet Sandhu became the first Indian female athlete to win an individual Asian Games gold medal, taking the 1970 title in the 400 metres. Decathlete Vijay Singh Chauhan winning the Asian Athletics Championships and Asian Games titles in 1973 and 1974. Men's triple jumper Mohinder Singh Gill won at the 1970 Asian Games, took the first two decathlon titles of the Asian Athletics Championships (1973 and 1975), as well as taking two minor medals at the Commonwealth Games. Sriram Singh established India in middle-distance running, winning two Asian Games golds and a silver that decade, three gold medals at the 1975 Asian Athletics Championships, and a seventh-place finish 1976 Olympic 800 m final. Shivnath Singh won four distance medals at the Asian Championships, placed 11th at the 1976 Olympic Marathon and set a long-standing national marathon record in 1978. In the second half of the decade, Hari Chand (long-distance), Bahadur Singh Chouhan (shot put), Hakam Singh (racewalking) and Suresh Babu (multi-events) each won multiple Asian medals and titles.

The Jawaharlal Nehru Stadium was constructed as the national stadium in preparation for hosting the 1982 Asian Games, representing an improvement in India's elite level sports infrastructure. India was third in the athletics rankings at the competition, behind the regional leaders China and Japan. Charles Borromeo (long jump), Chand Ram (racewalking), Bahadur Singh Chouhan, and M. D. Valsamma (hurdles) all won gold with games record performances. The competition marked an era of increased success for India's women athletes: Geeta Zutshi took two silver medals in middle-distance running and 18-year-old P. T. Usha won her first major medals with two silvers in the sprints. Usha reached the final of Women's 400 metres hurdles at 1984 Summer Olympics, setting an Asian record time in fourth place, and also helped the Indian women's 4 × 400 metres relay to the final. Usha went on to win four gold medals at the 1986 Asian Games and an unprecedented four individual titles at the 1985 Asian Athletics Championships. She was the nation's leading athlete at the 1989 Asian Athletics Championships, held in New Delhi, winning four gold medals and one silver. Usha continued to win medals at continental level into the late 1990s.

Usha won three of India's six athletics medals at the 1990 Asian Games, but the emergence of Qatar and South Korea saw India fall down the country rankings. Women's runner Shiny Wilson led the nation with two golds and a silver at the 1991 Asian Athletics Championships. Men's distance runner Bahadur Prasad set national records and took a gold and a silver medal at the 1993 Asian Athletics Championships. The 1994 Asian Games highlighted India's fall at regional level again: with zero golds, women's runners Usha, Wilson and Kutty Saramma were involved in the nation's minor medals. Jyotirmoyee Sikdar marked her breakthrough in middle-distance with India's sole gold medals at the 1995 Asian Athletics Championships and the 1998 Asian Games. Usha won the final gold medal of her career with the women's 4 × 100 metres relay team at the 1998 Asian Athletics Championships, which was India's only gold that year.

21st century

The start of the 21st century coincided with an improvement in the standard of performances in the sport in India. The country placed second at the 2000 Asian Athletics Championships, taking 21 of the medals available. It fell down the rankings at the 2002 edition, but still won ten medals and retained the women's 4 × 400 m relay title. After a long medal drought at the competition, discus thrower Neelam Jaswant Singh and long jumper Anju Bobby George reached the podium at the 2002 Commonwealth Games, becoming the first Indian women to do so. The 2002 Asian Games saw India return as a force at regional level, winning seven gold and 17 medals overall in athletics. On the women's side, Singh and George both won gold, K. M. Beenamol won 800 m and 4 × 400 m relay gold, Saraswati Saha won the 200 m, and Sunita Rani set the current Asian Games record in the 1500 metres. Bahadur Singh Sagoo was the sole men's gold medallist in the shot put.

Anju Bobby George made history when she won the bronze medal in Women's long jump at the 2003 World Championships in Athletics in Paris. With this achievement, she became the first Indian athlete ever to win a global athletics medal. Over the rest of the decade, she took fifth at the 2004 Summer Olympics, made two more finals at the World Championships in Athletics, won an Asian Championships title, and four more silver medals at Asian level. The Indian women's 4 × 400 metres relay team established itself as one of the best in the region in this decade, taking silver at the 2006 Commonwealth Games, gold at the 2006 Asian Games, seventh at the 2004 Olympics, and two Asian Championships titles in 2005 and 2007. Among the Indian relay runners were several athletes with individual success: Manjeet Kaur (2004 Asian Games runner-up), Chitra Soman (2007 Asian Championships winner) and Sathi Geetha (2005 Asian Championships runner-up). Other athletes who were successful during this period included 2007 Asian Championships men's triple jump champion Renjith Maheshwary, indoor and outdoor Asian men's shot put champion Navpreet Singh, Asian heptathlon medallists J. J. Shobha and Soma Biswas, and multiple Asian women's middle-distance runner Sinimole Paulose. Men's shot putter Om Prakash Karhana was India's sole winner at the 2009 Asian Athletics Championships, setting a championship record in the process.

The 2000s saw India begin to host major athletics events more frequently, with the 2004 Asian Cross Country Championships, 2003 Afro-Asian Games, 2004 IAAF World Half Marathon Championships, 2007 Military World Games, 2008 Commonwealth Youth Games and 2010 Commonwealth Games all representing the first time that India had hosted those competitions.

Krishna Poonia created history by winning the 2010 Commonwealth women's discus throw, becoming the first Commonwealth athletics gold medallist for India in 52 years and the first Indian woman to win an athletics gold at the Commonwealth Games. This was part of an Indian sweep of the women's discus, with Harwant Kaur and Seema Punia taking the minor medals. India won two athletics golds at a Commonwealth Games for the first time, as Manjeet Kaur, Sini Jose, Ashwini Akkunji and Mandeep Kaur secured the 4 × 400 m relay. That team returned at the 2010 Asian Games and achieved a Games record time in that victory. India won the second highest number of athletics gold medals there, with Akkunji and Joseph Abraham winning the 400 m hurdles titles, and women's distance runners Preeja Sreedharan and Sudha Singh also topping the podium. Mayookha Johny was India's best at the 2011 Asian Athletics Championships, winning the women's long jump and setting a triple jump national record. India performed well in the discus at the 2012 London Olympics, with Krishna Poonia and Vikas Gowda both making the finals. Irfan Kolothum Thodi also placed tenth in the men's 20 km walk with a national record time.

The 2013 Asian Athletics Championships held in Pune saw India accrue 17 medals. Gowda and the women's 4 × 400 metres relay team brought the country its two gold medals of the competition. Gowda was again victorious at the 2014 Commonwealth Games, winning a men's discus gold medal, and won silver at the 2014 Asian Games. The women's 4 × 400 metres relay team set an Asian Games record at that competition, with Priyanka Pawar, Tintu Lukka, Mandeep Kaur, and M. R. Poovamma clocking 3:28:68. Seema Punia brought India another gold in the women's discus event. The nation's gold medals at the 2015 Asian Athletics Championships were divided between men's throws (Inderjeet Singh and Vikas Gowda) and women's distance track events (Lalita Babar and Tintu Luka). Lalita Babar was the best performing Indian athlete at the 2016 Summer Olympics, placing tenth in the women's steeplechase.

India held the 2017 Asian Athletics Championships – its third time as host – and topped the medal table for the first time, beating China by twelve golds to eight. Govindan Lakshmanan won both the men's long-distance track events and Mohammad Anas and Arokia Rajiv took a men's 1–2 in the 400 m before winning the relay title. Neeraj Chopra won the men's javelin in a championship record of 85.23 m. Nirmala Sheoran was an individual and relay champion in women's 400 m. The remaining women's winners were P. U. Chitra (1500 m), Sudha Singh (steeplechase) and Swapna Barman (heptathlon). India extended its regional athletics success with second place at the 2018 Asian Games: Manjit Singh and Jinson Johnson won the men's middle distance titles, Arpinder Singh, Tejinder Pal Singh Toor and Neeraj Chopra won men's field titles, while the women' 4 × 400 m relay team and heptathlete Swapna Barman won the women's title. Throwing events proved to be India's forte at the 2018 Commonwealth Games, with Chopra adding a Commonwealth javelin title to his honours and Seema Punia making her fourth consecutive appearance on the Commonwealth women's discus podium.

Hima Das became India's first athlete to win a medal in a track event at an IAAF competition with her 400 m gold medal at the 2018 IAAF World U20 Championships. She is second gold medalist in athletics at IAAF World U20 Championships after Neeraj Chopra, who won men's javelin throw gold at the 2016 IAAF World U20 Championships with a world junior record mark.

Neeraj Chopra won the first ever Olympic gold medal in athletics for India at 2020 Tokyo Olympic in Japan. which was held July- August 2021. He is the first Javelin thrower from India who won a gold medal, and only the second Indian sportsperson after Abhinav Bindra, to win an Olympic gold medal. Neeraj is the youngest Olympic Gold medalist from India and the first track and field athlete of India to do so in his Olympic debut. He thrown his best of 87.58 meters in the Javelin throw final.

In 2022, Awinash Sable and Priyanka Goswami created history by winning first ever silver medals in 3000m and 10,000m Steeplechase and Reacewalking at Commonwealth games. India is underdog in both these events.

Para athletics

India first sent athletes at the 1968 Paralympic Games and won its first medals in 1984, when Joginder Singh Bedi won medals in three throwing events and Bhimrao Kesarkar took the javelin silver medal. Devendra Jhajharia became the nation's first Paralympic athletics champion in 2004, and only the second Indian to win in any Paralympic sport, after the swimmer Murlikant Petkar. The 2016 Summer Paralympics marked a new high for India as it win four medals, all in athletics: Mariyappan Thangavelu (high jump) and Devendra Jhajharia (javelin) won their events, Varun Singh Bhati took high jump bronze and Deepa Malik became India's first female Paralympic medallist with her shot put silver.

Controversies  

Indian athletes have been involved in several requests for sex verification in athletics in the 21st century.

In 2001, Indian athlete and swimmer Pratima Gaonkar committed suicide after disclosure and public commentary on her failed sex verification test. Santhi Soundarajan, who won the silver medal in the 800 m at the 2006 Asian Games, failed the sex verification test and was subsequently stripped of her medal. Another gold medallist at that competition, Pinki Pramanik, underwent medical tests in November 2012 that indicated she was a "male pseudo-hermaphrodite".

Dutee Chand was dropped from the 2014 Commonwealth Games at the last minute after the Athletic Federation of India stated that hyperandrogenism made her ineligible to compete as a female athlete. International policies on hyperandrogenism were suspended following the case of Dutee Chand v. Athletics Federation of India (AFI) & The International Association of Athletics Federations, in the Court of Arbitration for Sport, decided in July 2015. The ruling found that there was insufficient evidence that testosterone increased female athletic performance. In doing so the court immediately suspended the practice of hyperandrogenism regulation used by the IAAF and declared it void unless the organization could present better evidence by July 2017. The International Olympic Committee stated that it would not impose a maximum testosterone level for the 2016 Summer Olympics and, accordingly, Chand continued to compete internationally in the women's division.

International competitions
India has hosted several major international athletics events. The first was the Western Asiatic Games in 1934. India's first global level athletics event came in the form of the 2004 IAAF World Half Marathon Championships.

1934 Western Asiatic Games
1951 Asian Games
1982 Asian Games
1987 South Asian Games
1989 Asian Athletics Championships
1992 Asian Junior Athletics Championships
1995 South Asian Games
1996 Asian Junior Athletics Championships
2003 Afro-Asian Games
2004 Asian Cross Country Championships
2004 IAAF World Half Marathon Championships
2007 Military World Games
2008 Commonwealth Youth Games
2010 Commonwealth Games
2010 Asian Marathon Championships
2013 Asian Athletics Championships
2013 South Asian Junior Athletics Championships
2014 Lusophony Games
2016 South Asian Games
2017 Asian Athletics Championships

Venues

Numerous low-level athletics facilities exist in India, along with several large stadia for major athletics events. It is common for multi-purpose stadiums in India to include a running track for athletics.

Angul Stadium
Biju Patnaik Hockey Stadium
Birsa Munda Athletics Stadium
G. M. C. Balayogi Athletic Stadium
Indira Gandhi Athletic Stadium
Indira Gandhi Stadium, Alwar
Jaipal Singh Stadium
Jawaharlal Nehru Stadium (Chennai)
Jawaharlal Nehru Stadium (Coimbatore)
Jawaharlal Nehru Stadium (Delhi)
JRD Tata Sports Complex
Judges Field
Kalinga Stadium
Major Dhyan Chand Hockey Stadium, Jhansi
MGR Race Course Stadium
Nehru Stadium, Kottayam
Shilaroo Hockey Stadium

Annual events

National championships
Indian National Open Athletics Championships
Indian Inter State Senior Athletics Championships
Indian Marathon Championships
Indian Cross Country Championships
Indian Racewalking Championships

Road races
Delhi Half Marathon
Kashmir International Half Marathon
Pinkathon
World 10K Bangalore

Marathons
Auroville Marathon
Bangalore Marathon
Calicut Mini Marathon
Chennai Marathon
GiveLife Chennai Marathon
Goa Marathon
Great Tibetan Marathon
Hyderabad Marathon
Indian Marathon
Indira Marathon
Indore Marathon
Jaipur Marathon
Kolkata Marathon
Ladakh Marathon
Mumbai Marathon
Patna Marathon
Pune International Marathon
Sabarmati Marathon
Vadodara Marathon
Vasai-Virar Mayor's Marathon

Major international medallists

Notable performance at Summer Olympics

Total medals won by Indian athletes in major tournaments

Arjuna Award

The Arjuna Awards are given by the Ministry of Youth Affairs and Sports, Government of India each year to recognize outstanding achievement in sports. A significant number of athletics competitors have been given the award. This has included both able-bodied athletes and disabled sportspeople.

‡ - Para Athlete
§ - Lifetime Contribution

See also

 Sport in India

India at the Olympics
List of Indian records in athletics

References

External links
Athletics Federation of India website

 
Athletics
India
India